Namak Kur (also Romanized as Namak Kūr; also known as Namakho, Namak Kavīr, and Namak Khūr) is a village in Sedeh Rural District, in the Central District of Arak County, Markazi Province, Iran. As of the 2006 census, its population was 813, in 232 families.

References 

Populated places in Arak County